Jamnik or Jamník may refer to the following villages:

Poland
 Jamnik, Lesser Poland Voivodeship, southern Poland

Slovakia
 Jamník, Liptovský Mikuláš
 Jamník, Spišská Nová Ves

Slovenia
 Jamnik, Kranj, a settlement in the City Municipality of Kranj, northwestern Slovenia
 Jamnik, Vrhnika, a settlement in the Municipality of Vrhnika, west-central Slovenia